The British International School of Tunis (commonly abbreviated to BIST) is a private school in La Soukra, Ariana Governorate, Tunisia that provides elementary and secondary education. It enrolls about 250 students, aged 3 to 18, from Key Stage 1 to 5. The new sixth form opened in September 2020. The school is accredited by COBIS, has a membership to IAPS & is inspected under the ISI framework.

Mission of BIST
The British International School Tunis (BIST) is a friendly, thriving school at the heart of the British community in Tunis.
Inspected by the British Government, BIST delivers an engaging, inspirational, and rounded education for ages 3 to 18, creating warm, polite learners with an infectious zest for life and high aspirations.

Primary school

In terms of academics, BIST follows the English National Curriculum and is the first school in Tunis to be accredited by the Council of British International Schools (COBIS). Each class has a dedicated teacher, educated up to the British standard, who teaches the core curriculum of English, Math, and Science, along with supplementary classes in humanities (History and Geography), Sports (Physical Education), and PSHCEE (Personal, Social, Health, Citizenship, and Economic Education). We have Tunisian teaching assistants, all with English degrees, to offer additional support to the pupils. Alongside this, there are specialized teachers in multiple subjects, such as Art, Computing, Languages (French and Arabic), and Music. Within the classroom, children are regularly and consistently assessed, to ensure we can offer the best, personalized education that suits the pace of the pupils, and sets realistic and attainable goals for everyone, however high or low they may be. While we teach the children the importance of academic achievement, we also encourage them to take a deeper look into their potential. Pupils have the opportunity to take up to 4 hours of co-curricular activities every week, from a broad range of disciplines; from music, to karate, to knitting, we ensure each child can flourish within their own skillset.

Secondary school

The British International School of Tunis (BIST) Secondary School is for children aged 11 – 18 and is located in Le Kram, just south of Carthage.
Almost every class is led by a British-trained expatriate teacher and the school offers a stimulating environment and small class sizes. BIST Secondary School builds on the strong foundations made during students primary school education, with an innovative and stimulating programme aimed at developing all aspects of the pupils self, both academically and through interpersonal skills.

BIST secondary follows the English National Curriculum, using the unique international and local context that BIST can bring, to enhance teaching and learning to perfectly suit the student. BIST has a three-year KS3 curriculum, which is broad and balanced, offering all students the opportunities to build their skills, and lay the foundations needed to prepare them for the KS4 programme. Subjects we teach in KS3 include the core curriculum of English, Mathematics and Science, alongside subjects such as Art, Computing, Languages (French and Arabic), Geography, History, PE and PSCHEE. Our subject choices are constantly evolving, based on the wide range of choice from our quality teachers.

The curriculum at Key Stage 4 is a two-year course of study, culminating in external examinations based on the English National Curriculum. These examinations allow for a range of achievements from A*-G, with A*-C being considered the standard academic passing grade. The core curriculum at Key Stage 4 consists of Mathematics, English (First Language, Second Language and Literature), the Sciences, Physical Education and PSHCE. Students will then select from a wide range of available subjects at the school including Business Studies, History, Art and Music.

Sixth form school

The BIST Sixth Form opened in September 2020, offering a range of International A-Level and BTEC qualifications. At Key Stage 5, the focus is on preparing students for the next step. With this is mind, the BIST sixth form programme is diverse and mirrors the skills needed to for a move into Higher Education, whether is in Tunisia, Europe or North America. Staff advise and guide students through this complex time.

References

External links
 British International School of Tunis

British international schools in Tunisia
Schools in Tunis